The 1930 World Table Tennis Championships men's singles was the fourth edition of the men's singles championship.

Viktor Barna met his compatriot Laszlo Bellak in the final of this event. The latter won 21–14, 16–21, 21–16, 21–12.

Draw

Finals

References

-